Loddon Bridge could refer to:

The mediaeval London Bridge
Loddon Bridge disaster, a collapse of falsework during construction in Reading, Berkshire, in 1972